Sparnodus is an extinct genus of prehistoric perciform fish in the family Sparidae. Species of this genus were nektonic carnivore. These fishes lived in the Cenozoic Era, in Oligocene and Paleocene (55.8 to 23.03 Ma).

Species
 Sparnodus altivelis
 Sparnodus elongatus
 Sparnodus macrophthalmus
 Sparnodus micracanthus
 Sparnodus ovalis
 Sparnodus vulgaris

Description
They had a laterally compressed body, quite gibbous in the forepart, with a single dorsal fin, well developed and supported by strong spines. The anal fin was about half the length of the caudal one and was also equipped with spiny rays. Also the pectoral fins were long and well developed. The body was covered with large finely wrinkled scales. The mouth was small and had strong conical teeth. They had no palatal teeth nor protracted jaws.

Bibliography
Bannikov, A. 2006. Fishes from the Eocene of Bolca, northern Italy, previously classified in the Sparidae, Serranidae and Haemulidae (Perciformes). Geodiversitas, vol. 28, no2, pp. 249–275.
Day J. J. 2002. Phylogenetic relationships of the Sparidae (Teleostei: Percoidei) and implications for convergent trophic evolution. Biological Journal of the Linnean Society 76: 269-301
Day J. J. 2003. Evolutionary relationships of the Sparidae (Teleostei: Percoidei): integrating fossil and Recent data. Transactions of the Royal Society of Edinburgh: Earth Sciences 93: 333-353
L. Agassiz. 1839. Recherches Sur Les Poissons Fossiles. Tome IV (livr. 13). Imprimerie de Petitpierre, Neuchatel 109-204

See also

 Prehistoric fish
 List of prehistoric bony fish

References

External links
 Alexandre F. Bannikov - Fishes from the Eocene of Bolca, northern Italy, previously classified in the Sparidae, Serranidae and Haemulidae (Perciformes)
 The "Pesciara di Bolca" and the "Monte Postale"

Prehistoric perciform genera
Eocene fish
Paleocene fish
Fossils of Italy
Cenozoic fish of Europe